Mateus da Silva (born 30 August 1991) is a Brazilian footballer who plays for Tombense.

References

1991 births
Living people
Brazilian footballers
Brazilian expatriate footballers
Associação Atlética Ponte Preta players
Salgueiro Atlético Clube players
Mogi Mirim Esporte Clube players
Tombense Futebol Clube players
Clube Atlético Bragantino players
Mirassol Futebol Clube players
F.C. Paços de Ferreira players
C.D. Nacional players
Guarani FC players
Clube de Regatas Brasil players
Campeonato Brasileiro Série B players
Campeonato Brasileiro Série C players
Campeonato Brasileiro Série D players
Primeira Liga players
Liga Portugal 2 players
Association football midfielders
Brazilian expatriate sportspeople in Portugal
Expatriate footballers in Portugal